Shane John Jurgensen (born 28 April 1976 in Redcliffe, Queensland) is an Australian cricket coach and former cricketer. He has played for Queensland, but has also played for Western Australia, Tasmania, and the Sussex Cricket Board in English county cricket.

Playing career 

Shane Jurgensen was a talented fast bowler who rose to prominence on the Queensland club scene in the early 1990s. Unable to secure a place in his home state's side due to the strength of their bowling attack, he moved to Western Australia, where he made his first-class debut. After a couple of seasons with Western Australia, he moved to Tasmania, where he played some of his best cricket, including a hat-trick against New South Wales, and a record 11 wickets in the 2002-03 Pura Cup final against the Queensland Bulls.

Following his enormous success with Tasmania he returned to Queensland, fulfilling his dream of representing his home state.

Coaching career

New Zealand 

Jurgensen was New Zealand's bowling coach between 2008 and 2010 and was also a coach of New Zealand Cricket's high performance programme.

In February 2016, he was appointed as bowling coach of New Zealand cricket team.

Jurgensen is currently working for New Zealand on his second stint.

Bangladesh 

He was appointed as the Bowling Coach for the Bangladesh National Side in October 2011. Before joining Bangladesh team he worked as a bowling coach for New Zealand between 2008 and 2010. After the main coach of Bangladesh Stuart Law left the team in October 2012, he was appointed as interim head coach of Bangladesh. During his first assignment, Bangladesh beat the West Indies by 3–2 in ODI. They however suffered loss in test series by 2–0.

In February 2013 Bangladesh Cricket Board confirmed him as the head coach of the Bangladesh. Under his guidance, Bangladesh white washed New Zealand 3–0 in the ODI series when New Zealand came to visit Bangladesh in October 2013. The test series was drawn 0-0. New Zealand won the one off T-20 match.

Despite being the most successful coach of Bangladesh (at that time), in April 2014, he resigned from his position less than a month after the 2014 ICC World Twenty20 where Bangladesh suffered a shock loss to Hong Kong.

During his tenure, Bangladesh won a Test match after four years against Zimbabwe cricket team and drew Tests against Sri Lanka cricket team in Galle and against New Zealand at home.

Fiji
In May 2014 Jurgensen was appointed head coach of the Fiji national cricket team for a three-year term. He resigned in October 2015, but reversed his decision the following month. He oversaw the team's qualification for 2015 ICC World Cricket League Division Six and also coached the national under-19 team at the 2016 Under-19 Cricket World Cup. His contract was terminated in February 2016 after he took up a short-term contract with Cricket New Zealand, .

Scotland 

Jurgensen was roped in by Cricket Scotland as a consultant just before 2015 Cricket World Cup in Australia and New Zealand. He consulted Scotland cricket team only for one game, against Bangladesh.

Rangpur 

He was appointed by Rangpur Riders as their head coach for the BPL's third season. His team came third in the tournament with seven wins in 10 matches.

References

External links 
Cricinfo profile
https://www.nzc.nz/news-items/archive/jurgensen-bowling-coach-through-to-2019
Jurgensen becomes full-time Bangladesh coach
New Zealand visit of Bangladesh
https://www.stuff.co.nz/sport/cricket/76985365/shane-jurgensen-named-as-black-caps-bowling-coach

1976 births
Living people
Australian cricketers
Tasmania cricketers
Western Australia cricketers
Queensland cricketers
Sussex Cricket Board cricketers
Cricketers from Queensland
Coaches of the Bangladesh national cricket team
Australian cricket coaches
Bangladesh Premier League coaches
Australian expatriates in Bangladesh
Australian expatriates in Fiji